Alastair Henderson (1911–1979) was a Scottish footballer who played as a defender.

External links
 LFC History profile

1911 births
1979 deaths
Scottish footballers
Liverpool F.C. players
Yoker Athletic F.C. players
Leyton Orient F.C. players
Footballers from Glasgow
Association football defenders
Scottish Junior Football Association players